Bishwonath Upadhyaya (13 October 1930 – 30 January 2014) was the Chief Justice of Nepal from 1991 to 1995. He had previously served as chairman of the 1990 constitution drafting committee.

Early life
He was born in 1930 in Malangwa Sarlahi. He is survived by four sons, He was living with his eldest son in Kathmandu, His three other sons live in the US. He started his career in government service as legal officer in Nepal Rastra Bank in 1955 and later entered the Ministry of Law.

Famous For
The apex court bench led by him reinstated the parliament dissolved by then Prime Minister Man Mohan Adhikari in 28 August 1995. The bench was 11-membered which made decesion by a vote of eight to three. The parliament was dissolved by the King Birendra at the recommendation of then prime minister Man Mohan Adhikari as a pre-emptive move to avert a no-confidence motion tabled by the opposition. Lawmakers from the communist party have been trying to file impeachment motions in the parliament against him.

The Supreme Court has still been following the precedent set by him, he is known for his bold and proactive judge, when it comes to defining the issues of constitution and human rights.

He headed the constitution drafting committee of 1990, is also credited for his role in evolving Nepal's judiciary as separate institution.

References

1930 births
2014 deaths
Justices of the Supreme Court of Nepal
People from Malangwa
20th-century Nepalese judges
Chief justices of Nepal
Nepal Law Campus alumni